Noah Dawkins (born August 13, 1997) is an American football linebacker for the Michigan Panthers of the United States Football League (USFL). He played college football for The Citadel.

High school/college career
A native of Spartanburg, South Carolina he was a 2 year letterman at James F. Byrnes High School; as a senior he set a school record with 23 sacks; he was named the ESPN Upstate Player of the Year and the Spartanburg Herald Journal Defensive Player of the Year.

Dawkins was a member of The Citadel Bulldogs for four seasons. As a senior, Dawkins finished second on the team with  66 tackles and 13.5 tackles for loss and led the Bulldogs with 5.5 sacks and was named first-team All-Southern Conference. He finished his collegiate career with 166 tackles, 31.5 tackles-for-loss, 14.0 sacks, two forced fumbles and two interceptions.

Professional career

Cincinnati Bengals
After an impressive Pro Day in the spring of his senior year at The Citadel Dawkins was named to Mel Kipers "Big Board" list of 300 top draft picks but was not selected, he was signed by the Cincinnati Bengals as a free agent on May 11, 2019. He was waived by the Bengals at the end of training camp, but was re-signed to the team's practice squad.

Tampa Bay Buccaneers
Dawkins was signed off the Bengals' practice squad by the Tampa Bay Buccaneers. Dawkins made his NFL debut on October 27, 2019 against the Tennessee Titans.

On September 5, 2020, Dawkins was waived by the Buccaneers.

New York Jets
On September 22, 2020, the New York Jets signed Dawkins to their practice squad. He was elevated to the active roster on December 5, December 12, December 19, December 26, and January 2, 2021, for the team's weeks 13, 14, 15, 16, and 17 games against the Las Vegas Raiders, Seattle Seahawks, Los Angeles Rams, Cleveland Browns, and New England Patriots, and reverted to the practice squad after each game. He signed a reserve/future contract with the Jets on January 4, 2021.

On August 31, 2021, Dawkins was waived by the Jets. He was re-signed to the practice squad on September 14. He was promoted to the active roster on October 30, 2021. He was waived on November 2, 2021 and re-signed to the practice squad.

Chicago Bears
On February 22, 2022, Dawkins signed with the Chicago Bears. He was released on August 16, 2022.

Michigan Panthers
On March 14, 2023, Dawkins signed with the Michigan Panthers of the United States Football League (USFL).

References

External links
Tampa Bay Buccaneers bio
The Citadel bio

1997 births
Living people
American football linebackers
Chicago Bears players
Michigan Panthers (2022) players
New York Jets players
People from Lyman, South Carolina
Players of American football from South Carolina
Tampa Bay Buccaneers players
The Citadel Bulldogs football players